The Old Town Hall is located in the Downtown section of Stamford, Connecticut.  It is located at the southwest corner of Main and Atlantic Streets, occupying a portion of a triangular block bounded on the south by Bank Street.  The rest of the block is occupied by the modern portion of Stamford's city hall.  The building is an elegant Beaux Arts structure, designed by the New York City firm of Mellon and Jossely and built in 1905.

In the 1960s, city officials began to leave it for larger buildings. In the 1980s it was said to be abandoned, and left so for approximately 20 years. In 2001, with the help of state grants, the city began a renovation. In recent years, it has been rented to businesses as an office space.

The building was listed on the National Register of Historic Places on June 2, 1972.

See also
National Register of Historic Places listings in Fairfield County, Connecticut

References

City and town halls on the National Register of Historic Places in Connecticut
National Register of Historic Places in Fairfield County, Connecticut
Beaux-Arts architecture in Connecticut
Former seats of local government
Government buildings completed in 1905
City halls in Connecticut
Buildings and structures in Stamford, Connecticut
Clock towers in Connecticut
1905 establishments in Connecticut